"Spectre" is a song by the English rock band Radiohead, released on 25 December 2015. It was produced by Nigel Godrich, and written for the 2015 James Bond film Spectre, but went unused.

Radiohead initially submitted another song for the film, "Man of War", written in the 1990s. It was rejected by the producers as it had not been written for the film and was therefore ineligible for the Academy Award for Best Original Song. Radiohead suspended work on their ninth album, A Moon Shaped Pool (2016), to record another song, "Spectre", an orchestral ballad; however, the producers said it arrived too late, and that they could not use it in the film. They instead used "Writing's on the Wall" by Sam Smith as the opening song.

Radiohead released "Spectre" as a free download, their first release since 2011. It was also included as a B-side on the 2016 single "Burn the Witch" and the special edition of A Moon Shaped Pool. It received positive reviews.

Writing and recording 
In 2015, rumours spread that Radiohead would record the theme for the upcoming James Bond film Spectre. In July, the bookmaker William Hill suspended bets after a customer placed £15,000 at ten-to-one odds on Radiohead, suspecting insider knowledge.

Radiohead met the Bond production team to discuss writing the theme; the director, Sam Mendes, and the Bond actor Daniel Craig were both fans. Radiohead submitted "Man of War", a song written in the 1990s. The singer, Thom Yorke, had previously described it as an homage to Bond themes. The Spectre production team liked "Man of War", but rejected it when they discovered it had not been written for the film and was therefore ineligible for the Academy Award for Best Original Song. "Man of War" was instead released on OKNOTOK 1997 2017, the 2017 OK Computer reissue.

Radiohead suspended work on their ninth album, A Moon Shaped Pool (2016), to record another song for the film, "Spectre". However, the production team felt it was too melancholy for the title sequence, and instead used "Writing's on the Wall" by Sam Smith. The Bond producer Barbara Broccoli said that "Spectre" arrived too late to be used, and that the team had already created the title sequence using "Writing's on the Wall". Mendes attempted to use "Spectre" elsewhere in the film, but decided its lyrics made it distracting. He described the situation as "an utter nightmare ... We had this beautiful song and we weren't able to use it. But it's somehow cooler for Radiohead to have written a song that wasn't used."

Radiohead's producer, Nigel Godrich, described the experience as a "real waste of energy", and said it "caused a stop right when we were in the middle" of work on the album. Yorke said the decision not to use the song was "just politics as far as I can tell". The guitarist Jonny Greenwood said that Radiohead were free to finish and release "Spectre" as they wanted, and so "that side of it was really positive ... We get to have it back and it's ours and we got to put it out. We're really, really proud of it."

Composition 
"Spectre" is an orchestral ballad that features Yorke's falsetto with "jerky" piano chords, strings, and jazz-like drums.

Release 
Radiohead released "Spectre" on the audio platform SoundCloud on Christmas Day 2015. Yorke announced the song on Twitter, writing: "Last year we were asked to write a tune for Bond movie Spectre. Yes we were. It didn't work out ... but became something of our own which we love very much. As the year closes we thought you might like to hear it. Merry Christmas." It was the first Radiohead release since the 2011 single "Daily Mail" / "Staircase".

"Spectre" was included as the B-side on Radiohead's 2016 vinyl single "Burn the Witch". It was also included as a bonus track on the special edition of Radiohead's album A Moon Shaped Pool.

Reception 
Variety wrote that "Spectre" has "Radiohead's signature moody sound, with a somber sweeping grandeur that might have fit well into the Bond song canon". Pitchfork named it the week's "Best New Music", and wrote that it has "all the melodrama of a good Bond song but only a hint of the kitsch... [It is] one of the finest Radiohead songs in some years, much more than a one-off curiosity." Pitchfork said it was reminiscent of Radiohead's 2001 single "Pyramid Song". Chris DeVille of Stereogum picked "Spectre" as one of the week's best songs, writing that it was "beautiful" and a reminder that "Radiohead still have life left in them". After "Writing's on the Wall" won the Golden Globe Award for Best Original Song the following week, DeVille wrote that "Spectre" was "the more masterful of the two tracks".

Release history

References

2015 singles
2015 songs
2010s ballads
Pop ballads
Radiohead songs
Songs from James Bond films